Nawabzada Raja Matloob Mehdi is a Pakistani politician who had been a member of the National Assembly of Pakistan, from September 2016 to May 2018.

Political career
He began his political career by becoming chairman of Darapur Union Council in 2015.

He was elected to the National Assembly of Pakistan as a candidate of Pakistan Muslim League (N) from Constituency NA-63 (Jhelum-II) in by election held in August 2016. He received 82,896 votes and defeated Fawad Chaudhry, a candidate of Pakistan Tehreek-e-Insaf. Nawab family has deep roots in local politics. They have been elected for different assemblies since 1920. They have deep connections with Rajas, Awans, Maliks of whole constituency. Kadyal of Tobah are considered as the oldest and solid supporters of this family. The seat became vacant after his father Malik Iqbal Mehdi Khan died.

References

Living people
Pakistan Muslim League (N) MNAs
Punjabi people
Pakistani MNAs 2013–2018
Year of birth missing (living people)

Politicians from Jhelum